Community Noise Equivalent Level (CNEL) is a weighted average of noise level over time. It is used to compare the noisiness of neighborhoods. CNEL is frequently used in regulations of airport noise impact on the surrounding community.
A CNEL exceeding 65db is generally considered unacceptable for a residential neighborhood.

See also 
 National Council for Economics and Labour, CNEL in Italy

References 

Noise pollution